Golshan-e Bozorg Mokhtar (also Romanized as Golshan-e Bozorg Mokhtār; also known as Golshan) is a village in Sarrud-e Jonubi Rural District, in the Central District of Boyer-Ahmad County, Kohgiluyeh and Boyer-Ahmad Province, Iran. At the 2006 census, its population was 55, in 14 families.

References 

Populated places in Boyer-Ahmad County